Keswick is a civil parish and a town in the Borough of Allerdale in Cumbria, England.  It contains 51 listed buildings that are recorded in the National Heritage List for England.  Of these, one is listed at Grade I, the highest of the three grades, three are at Grade II*, the middle grade, and the others are at Grade II, the lowest grade. The parish includes the town of Keswick and the surrounding countryside, and part of Derwentwater, including Derwent Isle.  Most of the listed buildings are houses, shops and cottages, and associated structures in the town.  The other listed buildings include churches, public houses, hotels, bridges, a former Sunday school, a former railway station, a monument, a war memorial, and a former magistrate's court and police station.  The listed buildings on Derwent Isle are a large house and a former chapel.


Key

Buildings

References

Citations

Sources

Lists of listed buildings in Cumbria
Listed buildings